is a Japanese actor and voice actor. He has been married to actress Rei Yoshii since November 11, 2016.

Filmography

Film
Kōfuku no Alibi (2016)
Hibana: Spark (2017)

Television drama
Densha Otoko (2005)
Last Friends (2008), Tomohiko Ogura
Totto-chan! (2017), Kiyoshi Atsumi
Kamen Rider Geats (2022), Chirami

Television animation
Eureka Seven (2005) as Dominic Sorel
Medabots (xxxx) as Ivanovski
Ouran High School Host Club (xxxx) as Kazukiyo Souga (ep 21)
Sadamitsu the Destroyer (xxxx) as Kuron
The Prince of Tennis (xxxx) as Satoshi Horio

Original video animation
The Prince of Tennis: A Day on Survival Mountain (xxxx) as Satoshi Horio
The Prince of Tennis: The National Tournament (xxxx) as Junpei Horio; Satoshi Horio
Time Stranger Kyoko (xxxx) as Subordinate A

Stage
Prince of Tennis Live (xxxx) as Satoshi Horio

Radio
SCHOOL OF LOCK! (TOKYO FM/JFN)

Dubbing
The Sorcerer's Apprentice, Dave Stutler (Jay Baruchel)

References

External links
 Official profile 
 Official blog 
 
 

Japanese male film actors
Japanese male television actors
Japanese male stage actors
Japanese male voice actors
1974 births
Living people
Male actors from Tokyo
Male voice actors from Tokyo